Donovan M. Dela Cruz (born July 6, 1973, in Wahiawa, Hawaii) is an American politician and a Democratic member of the Hawaii Senate since January 19, 2011 representing District 22. Since August 2017, Dela Cruz has served as chair of the Senate Ways and Means Committee.

Education
Dela Cruz earned his BAs in communications and journalism from the University of Oregon. He was a member of the 2003 class of the Pacific Century Fellows.

Elections
2012 Dela Cruz and his 2010 Republican opponent Charles Aki were both unopposed for their August 11, 2012 primaries, setting up a rematch; Dela Cruz won the November 6, 2012 General election with 10,393 votes (69.2%) against Aki.
2010 When Democratic Senator Robert Bunda ran for Lieutenant Governor of Hawaii and left the Senate District 22 seat open, Dela Cruz won the four-way September 18, 2010 Democratic Primary with 3,005 votes (37.8%) in a field which included Representative Michael Magaoay, and won the November 2, 2010 General election with 8,738 votes (67.3%) against Republican nominee Charles Aki.

References

External links
Official page at the Hawaii State Legislature
Campaign site
 

1973 births
Living people
Democratic Party Hawaii state senators
People from Hawaii (island)
University of Oregon alumni
21st-century American politicians